Walt is the eighth studio album by the Croatian alternative rock band Pips, Chips & Videoclips, released in May 2013.

Reception
Croatian rock critic Aleksandar Dragaš gave the album a very favorable review, noting that it "doesn't have a single weak moment". In his opinion, Walt was the band's most compelling work in the 21st century.

Track listing
"Kratka povijest"
"Walt Disney"
"Trubač"
"Sa mnom tebi je zima"
"Mogu ti reć"
"Bi li ili ne bi"
"Htio bi da me voliš"
"Dementor"
"Dok smo hodali po zemlji"
"Plivač"

References

External links
Pips, Chips & Videoclips discography 

2013 albums
Pips, Chips & Videoclips albums